The Martha Washington Stakes is an American Thoroughbred horse race held annually at Oaklawn Park Race Track in Hot Springs, Arkansas. Open to three-year-old fillies, it is contested on dirt over a distance of one mile. It is now run in late January as an early prep race in the Road to the Kentucky Oaks.

Inaugurated in 1979, it was raced at 6 furlongs ( mile) until 2003 when it was modified to its present distance.

The Martha Washington Stakes was run in two divisions in 1979 and 2008.

Records
Speed record:
 1:36.40 - Rachel Alexandra (2009)

Largest winning margin:
  lengths - Eight Belles (2008)

Most wins by a jockey:
 7 - Pat Day (1984, 1986, 1987, 1988, 1990, 1992, 1995)

Most wins by a trainer:
 3 - William H. Fires (1988, 1995, 2005)
 3 - Robert E. Holthus (1993, 1996, 1999)

Most wins by an owner:
 3 - Patricia B. Blass (1988, 1995, 2005)

Winners

See also
Road to the Kentucky Oaks

References
The 2009 Martha Washington Stakes at Thoroughbred Times

External links
Video at YouTube of Eight Belles winning the 2008 Martha Washington Stakes
Video at YouTube of Rachel Alexandra winning the 2009 Martha Washington Stakes

Ungraded stakes races in the United States
Horse races in Arkansas
Flat horse races for three-year-old fillies
Recurring sporting events established in 1979
Oaklawn Park
1979 establishments in Arkansas